The Clare county football team represents Clare in men's Gaelic football and is governed by Clare GAA, the county board of the Gaelic Athletic Association. The team competes in the three major annual inter-county competitions; the All-Ireland Senior Football Championship, the Munster Senior Football Championship and the National Football League.

Clare's home ground is Cusack Park, Ennis. The team's manager is Colm Collins from Cratloe.

The team last won the Munster Senior Championship in 1992, but has never won the All-Ireland Senior Championship or the National League.

History

Clare has won two Munster Senior Football Championship (SFC) titles. The county competes in Division 2 of the National Football League.

1917: First Munster SFC title and only All-Ireland SFC final
Clare won its first Munster SFC in 1917, defeating Cork on a scoreline of 5–04 to 0–01. This was after losing deciders in 1912 and 1915 to Kerry and in 1916 to Cork. Clare then faced Galway in the 1917 All-Ireland Senior Football Championship (SFC) semi-final and won by a scoreline of 2–01 to 0–05. However, in the 1917 All-Ireland Senior Football Championship Final, Clare narrowly lost to Wexford by a scoreline of 0–09 to 0–05. Wexford had won the All-Ireland SFC in 1915 and 1916 and would complete a four-in-a-row in 1918.

1979: "Milltown Massacre"
A low point for the county team was the so-called "Milltown Massacre" in 1979. During a game played in Milltown Malbay, Clare lost to Kerry by a scoreline of 1–9 to 9–21, a difference of 35 points. Tommy Tubridy, the father of David, played in that game.

1990–1994: John Maughan and second Munster SFC title
Clare football's greatest day since 1917 arrived in 1992 when, under the stewardship of Mayo native John Maughan, the county won its second Munster SFC by defeating Kerry in the final at the Gaelic Grounds, Limerick, by a scoreline of 2–10 to 0–12. This victory was aided in no small part by two second half goals from Colm Clancy and Martin Daly. This victory was also historic in that it is the only year from 1936 to 2020 (when Tipperary won) that neither Kerry nor Cork won the Munster SFC. Clare's luck would run out however, and in the 1992 All-Ireland SFC semi-final, the team lost to Dublin by a scoreline of 3–14 to 2–12. Full back on the team of 1992 was Seamus Clancy, brother of full-forward Colm, and he was rewarded for his performances in the 1992 championship with a place on the All-Star team of that year.

2013–present: Colm Collins
Collins led Clare from Division 4 to Division 2 of the National Football League.

Clare qualified for a 2016 All-Ireland SFC quarter-final by defeating Roscommon.

Won against Roscommon again, this time at Croke Park, in the 2022 All-Ireland SFC.

Support
Clare has its own supporters' club, which is separate from the supporters' club of the county hurling team.

Current panel

Current management team
Apppointed in October 2013, some additions noted.
Manager: Colm Collins (Cratloe)
Coach: Brian Carson, replacing Gerry McGowan (Tourlestrane) at the end of the 2022 season; McGowan succeeded Carson from 2021, while Paudie Kissane, Ephie Fitzgerald and Mick Bohan all coached Clare for one year under Colm Collins's management before Alan Flynn and Brian Carson served two years each
Assistant coach: Mark Doran (Down), from the end of the 2022 season
Goalkeeping coach: Joe Hayes, replacing Declan O'Keeffe at the end of the 2022 season
Selectors: Enda Coughlan and Declan Downes
Strength and conditioning coach: Michael Cahill (Limerick), replacing Rob Mulcahy at the end of the 2022 season

Managerial history
Clare have a history of appointing "foreign" managers, with John Maughan, from Mayo, proving to be the most successful; Maughan led Clare to the 1992 Munster SFC (a first in 75 years). Other outsiders to manage Clare include Frank Doherty (Galway) and the Kerrymen Donie Buckley (who managed jointly with Michael Brennan from Galway), John Kennedy, John O'Keeffe, Mick O'Dwyer and Páidí Ó Sé. However, Colm Collins (from Clare GAA club Cratloe) began managing the team in 2013 and lasted so long that RTÉ called him "an icon of stability" in 2022, in contrast to less successful managerial appointments elsewhere.

Players

Notable players

Gary Brennan
Gordon Kelly

Records
David Tubridy became top scorer in National Football League history against Cork in May 2021, his total score in the competition after this game (22–412, i.e. 478 points) causing him to overtake the record of Mickey Kearins.

All Stars
Clare has one All Star.

Competitive record
All-Ireland SFC final record

Honours

National
All-Ireland Senior Football Championship
 Runners-up (1): 1917
All-Ireland Senior B Football Championship
 Winners (2): 1991
Tommy Murphy Cup
 Winners (1): 2004
National Football League Division 2
 Winners (2): 1992, 1995
National Football League Division 3
 Winners (2): 1987, 2016
National Football League Division 4
 Winners (1): 1982
All-Ireland Minor Football Championship
 Winners (1): 1929

Provincial
Munster Senior Football Championship
 Winners (2): 1917, 1992
 Runners-up (12): 1912, 1915, 1916, 1919, 1925, 1929, 1936, 1937, 1941, 1949, 1997, 2012
McGrath Cup
 Winners (13): 1982, 1983, 1984, 1986, 1990, 1991, 1994, 1995, 1997, 2000, 2002, 2008, 2019
Munster Football League
 Winners (1): 1933–34
Munster Junior Football Championship
 Winners (1): 1925
Munster Minor Football Championship
 Winners (3): 1929, 1930, 1953

Minor team
Clare have won one All-Ireland and three Munster titles at minor level. They won the first of their three Munster Minor Football Championships defeating Waterford in 1929. Clare then proceeded to qualify for the inaugural All-Ireland Minor Football Final. In the final they faced Longford and prevailed by 5-03 to 3-05, to crown Clare All-Ireland Minor Champions. Clare defeated Tipperary in the 1930 Munster final to retain their provincial crown. The Banner County had to wait until 1953 for another Munster title. On this occasion Clare defeated Cork in the decider.

Competitive record
All-Ireland Minor Football Championship Final appearances

References

 
County football teams